is a town located in Kaga District, Okayama Prefecture, Japan. As of March 1, 2017, the town has an estimated population of 11,989 and a density of 45 persons per km². The total area is 268.73 km².

Kibichūō was founded on October 1, 2004 by the merger of the town of Kamogawa, from Mitsu District, and the town of Kayō, from Jōbō District.

Geography

Neighbouring municipalities 

 Okayama
 Sōja
 Takahashi
 Maniwa
 Misaki

Transportation 
There are no railway stations within Kibichūō.

Highways 

 Okayama Expressway
 Japan National Route 429
 Japan National Route 484

References

External links

Kibichūō official website 

Towns in Okayama Prefecture